Alan Rogers Guides is a campsite guide publisher which was started in Britain in 1968 by camp enthusiast Alan Rogers. The guides place utmost importance on the quality of the campsites; campsites cannot pay to be in the guide. Travel guides have been published every year (with the exception of 2017) since 1968. In 2018, Alan Rogers Guides celebrated its 50th anniversary.

How the campsites are chosen 
The guides rely on a team of Site Assessors, all of whom are experienced caravanners or motorcaravanners, to visit and recommend parks. The popularity of the guides is based their impartiality and supported by the enthusiasm, diligence and integrity of the Site Assessors.

The most important criteria used when inspecting and selecting parks is quality. The Assessors consider and evaluate:

The welcome
The pitches
The sanitary facilities
The cleanliness
The general maintenance
The location

The guides try to cater for a wide variety of preferences; from those seeking a small peaceful campsite in the heart of the countryside, to visitors looking for an 'all singing, all dancing' park in a popular seaside resort.

History 

The first guide (Alan Rogers' selected sites for caravanning and camping in Europe) sold for four shillings (20p). In the introduction to the first guide Alan wrote "I would like to stress that the camps which are included in this book have been chosen entirely on merit and no payment of any sort is made by them for their inclusion."

Alan Rogers continued to expand until 1986 when Alan Rogers, aged 70, decided to seek retirement. The publishing company, then known as Deneway Guides and Travel Ltd, was sold to Clive & Lois Edwards in Dorset who ran the guides for the next 15 years with the help of Susie & Keith Smart who undertook the desktop publishing role and a small team of Campsite Inspectors directed by Lois. By the time the Mark Hammerton Group acquired the company from Clive & Lois in 2001 shortly after Alan Rogers' death the Guides had developed from featuring less than 100 campsites in Britain, France and a few other Western European countries to featuring over 1000 campsites throughout Europe, all of which were selected and regularly inspected. In the meantime Clive & Lois had been awarded the Catalan Tourist Medal by the Catalan Government  in recognition of the Guides contribution to tourism in Catalonia. 

In 2004, the business moved to its current premises in the Kent countryside.

The Mark Hammerton Group was acquired by Caravan and Motorhome Club under the brand Alan Rogers Travel Group along with its subsidiary company Belle France. The guides continue to recommend campsites based on strict criteria and independent assessments. Sites are added where appropriate and removed if standards have fallen.

Success 
The guides have been influential in the rise in popularity of camping; for example, drawing attention to the number of overseas sites that were providing mains electricity hook-ups. Alan Rogers suggested that British caravanners and motor caravanners should take advantage of this by having their units wired to take mains electricity; in 1968 no standard British caravan was supplied with mains electricity wiring.

One measure of the guides' success is that many of the things he called for in the original guide have now become reality:
Mains electricity connections in caravans and motor caravans
Marked pitches of a minimum size
Hot water freely available in the amenity blocks
British style toilets on French campsites
The use of trees and bushes to mark pitches
An end to the practice of over-crowding of sites during the peak summer holiday times

Many of the sites personally recommended by Rogers' in 1968 are still recommended in the current guide.

External links 
 alanrogers.com - Official website for the guides

See also 
Alan Rogers
Alan Rogers Travel Group
Caravan and Motorhome Club

References 
Cordee - Britain and Ireland Guide for sale

Handbooks and manuals
Travel guide books
Books about camping